= Borntea =

Chinese tea brand

- Company type: Private
- Founded: 2017
- Founder: Raymond Sze and Leo Wong
- Headquarters: Hong Kong
- Products: Chinese Tea
- Website: https://www.borntea.com/

Borntea is a Chinese tea brand that sells loose leaf tea sourced from China. Borntea is based in Hong Kong. Founded in 2017 by two alumni Raymond Sze Wai Hang and Leo Wong Lu Yeung in Hong Kong University of Science and Technology.

== Early history ==
Before the official launch, the two founder had conducted user tests in the airport as there are more foreigners. They found the suitable tea types for foreigners and had successfully sold more than 10,000 cups of tea in 3 months.

== Product ==
The two founder sourced the teas from their hometown: Yunnan and Fujian Province in China. They have also developed a double-wall glass bottle to cater the needs for people out of China.
